Tomáš Konečný may refer to:

 Tomáš Konečný (cyclist) (born 1973),  Czech racing cyclist
 Tomáš Konečný (table tennis) (born 1985), Czech table tennis player